The William Jay Gaynor Memorial is a memorial in Brooklyn's Cadman Plaza, in the U.S. state of New York. It features a bronze bust of William Jay Gaynor designed by Adolph Alexander Weinman on a pink Milford granite base. The monument was cast in 1926.

References

External links

1926 establishments in New York City
1926 sculptures
Bronze sculptures in Brooklyn
Downtown Brooklyn
Granite sculptures in New York City
Monuments and memorials in Brooklyn
Outdoor sculptures in Brooklyn
Sculptures of men in New York City